Catholic communion may refer to:

 Catholic Church, the individuals and groups in communion with the Holy See
 Degrees of communion with the Catholic Church
 Eucharist in the Catholic Church, also called Holy Communion

See also 

 Koinonia
 Catholic (term)